The Pakistan national cricket team toured England in 2006 for a four-match Test series, a five-match One Day International series and a single Twenty20 International. After a drawn first Test, England won the next two matches before being awarded the final match in controversial circumstances; on the fourth day, Pakistan's players were penalised for ball tampering and refused to resume play after the tea interval, leading the umpires to award England the match and a 3–0 series victory. In 2008, the ICC controversially declared the result of the final Test as a draw, altering the scoreline to 2–0; however, after criticism, not least by the MCC, this was subsequently reversed in February 2009 and the result restored as an England victory.

Background
England had toured Pakistan the previous winter, with Pakistan winning the three-match Test series 2–0 and the five-match ODI series 3–2. As a result of the Test series, Pakistan rose two spots in the world Test rankings to be ranked second going into the return tour, and England dropped to third after the 12 July annual update of the ICC Test Championship.

Schedule

Squads

Tour matches

First-class: Leicestershire v Pakistanis

First-class: Pakistanis v England A

First-class: Northamptonshire v Pakistanis

One-day: Pakistanis vs West Indies A

List A: Pakistanis vs West Indies A

Test series

1st Test

England made an opening stand 60 runs before losing their first two wickets in quick succession, as Marcus Trescothick fell, followed an over later by captain Andrew Strauss. Kevin Pietersen was the next man out, adding just 28 runs for the third wicket, but Alastair Cook and Paul Collingwood both reached centuries on the way to a fourth-wicket partnership of 233 runs before Cook was out for 105. Collingwood top-scored in the innings with 186, and Ian Bell also managed an unbeaten 100 before England immediately declared on 528/9 with half a session left in the second day's play.

Steve Harmison took two wickets in three balls before the close of play, helping England reduce Pakistan to 68/4 early on the third day; however, Mohammad Yousuf and captain Inzamam-ul-Haq added 173 runs for the fifth wicket, and Kamran Akmal also made a half-century, reaching 58 before he was caught behind off the bowling of Kevin Pietersen. Despite partners falling around him, Mohammad Yousuf managed to bat on to a double-century before he was caught behind off Harmison to close the innings – Harmison finished with figures of 4/94.

England began the process of building on their 83-run lead early on the fourth day, but Strauss' 128 was the only notable score as they amassed 296 runs before declaring early on the final day, giving Pakistan a target of 380 to chase in 73 overs. Salman Butt fell to the first ball of the innings from Hoggard, followed by Imran Farhat to leave the tourists at 33/2; however, scores of 48 from Faisal Iqbal and Mohammad Yousuf got them to 141/4, before Inzamam-ul-Haq and Abdul Razzaq batted out the last session for 73 to secure a draw.

2nd Test

With Inzamam-ul-Haq's run of half-centuries against England finally stopped, as he was caught by Kevin Pietersen off Steve Harmison's bowling for a duck, England recorded an innings victory over Pakistan to take a 1–0 lead into the third Test. In the first innings, Pakistan lost the last eight wickets for 29 to post 119 with no batsmen making a half-century; England surpassed that score for the loss of two wickets, and with Alastair Cook and Ian Bell both making hundreds (127 and 106* respectively), England could eventually declare near the end of day two having made 461. It took England 63 overs to clean up, with Harmison and Monty Panesar sharing the ten wickets evenly (the only wicket takers in both innings) with the help of wicket keeper Geraint Jones, who caught five despite his fractured finger. Panesar took his second five-wicket-haul in three months, and was praised by opposition coach Bob Woolmer.

3rd Test

After their innings defeat in the second test, Pakistan dropped Shahid Afridi and Abdul Razzaq, and had to swap Imran Farhat out due to injury. They brought in Salman Butt and Taufeeq Umar to open the innings, plus the bowling of Shahid Nazir. England only made one change, which was to swap the struggling wicketkeeper Geraint Jones for Chris Read. The wicketkeeper position had been the subject of much debate. Read was perceived as the better keeper, although Jones' batting skills were considered to be superior. However, Jones had not scored a significant innings for some time and Read was given an opportunity to impress for the first time since the West Indies tour of 2004.

The first day of the test prompted some interesting incidents as England won the toss and batted first. In the morning, there were three rogue decisions from the umpires (who had been testing the use of earpieces to communicate with off-field officials); in the afternoon Kevin Pietersen left the field in bizarre circumstances, and Pakistan responded with 11 overs of very mediocre bowling, using their opening batsmen to bowl during the period before the second new ball was due.

In amongst all this, Pietersen scored his 5th test century, and helped propel England to 347/6 by the end of the day. England continued on day 2, with Ian Bell posting his third consecutive test century, and the lower order added useful runs before England were bowled out for 515.

Pakistan's openers once again struggled, and they fell quickly to leave the tourists on 36/2. However, the experienced combination of Younis Khan and Mohammad Yousuf then combined to produce the largest partnership for Pakistan against England of 363 for the third wicket. They batted well into the afternoon session of the third day, before Yousuf gloved Stephen Harmison through to the keeper having scored 192.

Pakistan then lost some of their advantage in a bizarre passage of play leading up to the tea interval. Younis was run out on 173, Faisal Iqbal fell lbw to his first delivery faced (giving Paul Collingwood his first test wicket), and Inzamam-ul-Haq lost his wicket in a comical way, overbalancing while attempting to sweep a Monty Panesar delivery and falling onto his stumps.

The lower order batsmen tried to accelerate the scoring, but lost regular wickets in the process, and Pakistan were finally bowled out for 538.

England's second innings started well, with the openers putting on 158 for the first wicket. Andrew Strauss went on to score 116, and Chris Read scored 55 down the order, but the other wickets fell quite regularly as England attempted to set up a position where they could push for a win on the final day. Pakistan's bowling attack shared the wickets between them, and eventually bowled England out for 345. Pakistan needed 323 runs on the final day to win.

England's bowlers performed well on the final day, and took 5 wickets in the first session ensuring the 323 run target was well out of Pakistan's reach. The run out of Mohammad Yousuf for a single figure score was a key moment in the innings – in fact, Pakistan lost 3 of their top order batsmen to run outs during the game. Sajid Mahmood struck twice in an over shortly before lunch to remove Faisal Iqbal and Kamran Akmal, and would go on to record test best figures of 4/22.

Monty Panesar also demonstrated his promising talent, taking 3 wickets in the second innings to follow up on 3 wickets in the first, on a pitch not typically associated with assisting spinners. His dismissal of Younis Khan during the afternoon session was spectacular, with a wonderfully flighted delivery that just clipped the bail of the off stump.

From this point, it was a matter of time before England took the honours.

As a result of a rib injury obtained during the course of the Test (and determined to be an internal injury rather than an external one) the Pakistan Captain, Inzamam-ul-Haq, was unable to bat for 4h20m in the Pakistan 2nd innings, or until the fall of the 5th wicket (whichever came first). As England took five wickets in the first session of the last day, he was able to come in at number 7 in the order. His wicket was eventually the last to fall, being stumped off the bowling of Monty Panesar, and Pakistan were all out for 155.

England won the match by 167 runs, and took an unassailable 2–0 lead in the series, with one left to play.

4th Test

Pakistan made three changes to their side for the final test. The uncertainty of the opening pair continued, with Salman Butt and Taufeeq Umar being dropped in favour of Imran Farhat and Mohammad Hafeez. The tourists' bowling ranks were boosted by the return of Mohammad Asif, for whom Mohammad Sami made way.

Pakistan won the toss and chose to field in cloudy conditions. This proved to be a good decision, as Pakistan's seamers Umar Gul and Mohammad Asif took eight wickets between them on the way to bowling England out for 173. Asif in particular caused problems for England's batsmen, and left people wondering what the outcome of the series would have been had he not been injured for the earlier tests.

Late on day 1, Pakistan began their reply confidently, and their fourth opening partnership combination of the series proved to be the most successful one. Hafeez hit some good shots before retiring hurt with a knee problem. He would return to complete his innings and score 95, while Farhat scored 91. England's poor first day was complete when they dropped Mohammad Yousuf twice before he reached double figures. He went on to score 128, his third century of the series.

Pakistan continued their dominance of the match on day 2, with the close of play score at 336/3, a lead of 163. On day 3, England finally managed to start taking wickets in between frequent rain and bad light interruptions, but they were not able to curtail Pakistan's scoring. Faisal Iqbal ended on 58 not out, his first contribution in the series. Pakistan were finally bowled out for 504, a lead of 331.

Marcus Trescothick was dismissed early in England's second innings, in what would be his last test match appearance for England. Andrew Strauss and Alastair Cook then progressed the score to 78/1 at the close of play.

The (what would prove to be eventful) fourth day began with Strauss and Cook continuing on the improved batting performance before Strauss fell lbw to Danish Kaneria with the score on 115. Kevin Pietersen came in and played an aggressive innings, hitting 96 from 114 deliveries, and only falling when he chased a wide delivery in an attempt to bring up his century.

The dismissal of Cook for 83 off the bowling of Umar Gul, with a delivery of reverse swing, resulted in umpires Darrell Hair and Billy Doctrove calling a halt to play so a set of used balls could be brought out to the middle: Hair and Doctrove ruled that the ball had been tampered with, and awarded 5 penalty runs to England. 

Following this incident, Pakistan subsequently refused to continue the match after tea: in keeping with the Laws of Cricket, and despite protests from Pakistan players and officials, Hair and Doctrove awarded the match to England on a forfeit. 

The ICC changed the result of the match to a draw in July 2008, but reversed this decision on 1 February 2009.

T20 series

Only T20I

Pakistan won the match by five wickets. After bowling out four of England's upper order batsmen for fewer than 20 runs between them, Pakistan secured a comfortable win aided by Shahid Afridi who struck 28 off just 10 balls (22 of these in a single over).

England ODI series

1st ODI

2nd ODI

3rd ODI

Shoaib Akhtar was in the spotlight after television cameras caught him working on the ball. The pictures appeared to show Akhtar flicking his thumb at the ball. However, ICC referee Mike Procter analysed the TV footage and decided there was no case to answer on behalf of the Pakistani team.

4th ODI

5th ODI

Scotland ODI match

Only ODI

Pakistan won the match by five wickets, after Scotland lost four wickets in the first eight overs and then four more in the remaining 42. Ryan Watson and Neil McCallum put on 116 for the fifth wicket, an ODI record partnership for Scotland, who played their first ODI for seven years. Their innings also doubled the number of ODI fifties scored for Scotland.

Notes

References
 Playfair Cricket Annual
 Wisden Cricketers Almanack 2007

External sources
CricketArchive

2006
2006 in English cricket
International cricket competitions in 2006
Cricket controversies
2006 in Pakistani cricket